The TMNT Shellraiser is a steel indoor roller coaster at Nickelodeon Universe amusement park, within the American Dream Meadowlands shopping and entertainment complex, at the Meadowlands Sports Complex in East Rutherford, New Jersey, United States. The roller coaster is a Euro-Fighter model manufactured by Gerstlauer, and themed to the Teenage Mutant Ninja Turtles (TMNT). It is the steepest roller coaster in the world with a vertical drop of 121.5 degrees. The TMNT Shellraiser has the exact same layout as Takabisha at Fuji-Q Highland in Japan, the previous record holder for world's steepest roller coaster.

History 
In September 2016, officials at the long-delayed American Dream Meadowlands shopping mall announced that the Nickelodeon Universe theme park would be built inside the mall. Details about the park's coasters, including a Gerstlauer Euro-Fighter with the world's steepest drop, were revealed in December 2017. According to the mall's attractions director, Jeff Davis, the Euro-Fighter design was chosen because it would "break a world record [...] to claim the steepest coaster in the world", and that he "anticipate[d] up to 50 percent" of residents in the New York metropolitan area to ride the coaster. Vertical construction of the attraction officially began in early 2018. The names for the TMNT Shellraiser and three other coasters were first announced by Nickelodeon Universe representatives at American Coaster Enthusiasts' February 2019 "EastCoaster" summit. At that point, construction on the coaster was well underway. Ride testing began in April 2019.

The TMNT Shellraiser soft-opened October 25, 2019, as part of the opening of the first attractions at Nickelodeon Universe in American Dream Meadowlands. The ride was temporarily closed after its soft opening because it did not have a permit to operate.

Ride experience 
TMNT Shellraiser is located entirely inside the structure of American Dream Meadowlands. The train leaves the station and then immediately enters a slow heartline roll. Immediately afterward, the coaster enters a banana roll inversion, a second corkscrew, and an airtime hill. The train ascends onto a set of block brakes, slowing the train down before it makes a U-turn to the right and ascends the  vertical chain lift hill. Once at the top, the car is held by a brake before entering the 121.5°,  beyond-vertical drop. Once the car is released from the top of the hill, it enters a dive loop, an inline loop, and an Immelmann loop, before hitting the final brake run and returning to the station.

Characteristics 

TMNT Shellraiser has green track with purple and light-blue supports, and has a total of seven inversions. At the top of the lift hill, the train is held by the brake for 14 seconds before being released into the drop. Riders are positioned so that they have a view of the New York City skyline in the distance. A section of the building's ceiling is raised slightly to accommodate the lift hill, as well as the windows facing New York City. The  drop, at an angle of 121.5 degrees, is the steepest in the world, beating the previous record-holder Takabisha by half a degree.

There are six trains, each with a single car. Each car has two rows of seating, with four seats per row. The trains were given a custom paint design by "a local auto body artist."

The ride is themed around the Teenage Mutant Ninja Turtles fighting the supervillain Shredder in New York City's streets.

Reception
A writer for USA Today said, "Shellraiser was a tad rough, but a load of fun." Travel + Leisure magazine said that "thrill seekers will love the scream-inducing Shellraiser."

Notes

References 

2019 establishments in New Jersey
Roller coasters in New Jersey
Shellraiser
Nickelodeon Universe
Nickelodeon in amusement parks
Indoor roller coasters
East Rutherford, New Jersey